The 2017 Under-21 Provincial Championship was the 2017 edition of the Under-21 Provincial Championship, an annual national Under-21 rugby union competition held in South Africa, and was contested from 25 August to 28 October 2017.

Western Province U21 fly-half Tiaan Swanepoel was the top scorer in the competition with 123 points, while Blue Bulls U21 wing Xolisa Guma was the top try scorer with 11 tries.

Competition rules and information

There were seven participating teams in the 2017 Under-21 Provincial Championship. They played each other once during the pool stage, either at home or away. Teams received four points for a win and two points for a draw. Bonus points were awarded to teams that scored four or more tries in a game, as well as to teams that lost a match by seven points or less. Teams were ranked by log points, then points difference (points scored less points conceded).

The top four teams in the pool stage qualified for the semifinals, which were followed by a final.

Teams

The teams that played in the 2017 Under-21 Provincial Championship were:

Pool stage

Standings

The final standings of the 2017 Under-21 Provincial Championship Pool Stage were:

Matches

Round one

Round two

Round three

Round four

Round five

Round six

Round seven

Title play-offs

Semifinals

Final

Honours

The honour roll for the 2017 Under-21 Provincial Championship was as follows:

Players

The following squads were named for the 2017 Under-21 Provincial Championship:

See also

 2017 Currie Cup Premier Division
 2017 Currie Cup First Division

References

External links
 SARU website

2017 in South African rugby union
2017 rugby union tournaments for clubs
2017